Buniayu Cave is a tourist destination area known for its caves adventure. Located on an area of approximately 10 hectares, Buniayu is located in the village of Kerta Angsana, Sukabumi, West Java, Indonesia.

Name origin 
The cave was better known as Cipicung cave because its location is within the area of Cipicung village. It is known as Siluman cave by spelunkers. Since the Perum Perhutani took over the management of this area, on 26 February 1992, the name of the cave was changed to Wana Wisata Buniayu Cave. Buniayu name itself is taken from the Sundanese language which consists of the word "Buni" which means "hidden" and "Ayu" which means "beautiful". Therefore, Buniayu means "hidden beauty".

History 
Since 1992, the resort is operated by Perum Perhutani Unit III Jawa Barat (West Java) and Banten. There are two caves in the area, namely Goa Angin (Wind Cave) and Goa Kerek (Kerek Cave). Goa Angin or Wind Cave is used for general interest tourism, while Goa Kerek is used for special interest tourism.

Wind Cave 
Wind Cave is a horizontal cave with the approximate distance around 300 meters or around 1.5 – 2 hours (backtrack). The cave is open to public because, to enter, the visitor would not require special equipment.

Tunnel 

 Depth of vertical hole: Non vertical
 Area of chamber (room): Varies at some point
 Horizontal alley length: ± 300 m (travel time 2 hours round-trip)
 Hallway width: 1 – 20 meters
 Ceiling height: 2 – 25 meters on average from the cave floor

Waters 

 River width: 1 – 2 meters
 River water level altitude: 0.5 – 3 meters (high intensity rainfall), 15 cm (dry)
 Diameter of the lake: None
 Depth of lake: None
 Waterfall height: None

Types of ornaments 

 Stalactite, shaped like a spear
 Stalagmites, located always under the stalactites
 Drapery, shaped like a shark's fin
 Gourdam (baby gourdam, micro gourd), dome-shaped with a surface resembling a patch of rice fields
 Canopy, shaped like an umbrella
 Flow stone, shaped like a frozen waterfall
 Column, shaped like a pillar (originally from stalactite and stalagmite that have been fused)

Types of biota 

 Crickets bat (megachiroptra)
 Spider
 Fish
 Shrimp
 Lizard
 Swallow (Collocalia)

General condition of the tunnel 

 Wet with 60 – 70% humidity and temperature around 22 – 25 °C
 Climb angle between 30 ° - 45

Kerek Cave 
To enter Kerek Cave, visitors will need special equipment. Kerek Cave is a cave with vertical entrance, around 30 meters tall. The distance from the entrance of the cave to the exit is around 2.5 kilometers or around 5 – 6 hours. With the number of cave floors collapsed as a result of water erosion, this cave is categorized as a cave with medium adventure level with quite high level of risk. Therefore, special equipment and professional guides are required. For that reason, this cave is only opened for visitors with special interest.

Tunnel 

 Depth of vertical hole: ± 32 meters (entrance)
 Area of chamber (room): ± 1½ of soccer field
 Horizontal alley length: ± 2.5 km (travel time 5 – 7 hours to the horizontal exit hole)
 Hallway width: 1 – 20 meters
 Ceiling height: 2 – 35 meters on average from the cave floor

Waters 

 River width: 1 – 2 meters
 Surface height: 50 – 90 cm (high intensity rainfall), 15 cm (dry)
 Diameter of the lake: ± 10 meters
 The depth of the lake: ± 5 – 7 meters
 The height of the waterfall: ± 15 meters

Types of ornaments 

 Stalactite, shaped like a spear
 Stalagmites, located always under the stalactites
 Drapery, shaped like a shark's fin
 Gourdam (baby gourdam, micro gourd), dome-shaped with a surface resembling a patch of rice fields
 Canopy, shaped like an umbrella
 Flow stone, shaped like a frozen waterfall
 Column, shaped like a pillar (originally from stalactite and stalagmite that have been fused)

Type of biota 

 Crickets
 Bat (megachiroptra)
 Spider
 Fish
 Shrimp
 Lizard
 Swallow (Collocalia)

General condition of the tunnel 

 Wet with 60 – 70% humidity and temperature around 22 – 25 °C
 Climb angle between 40 ° - 50 °

Other caves 
In addition to Wind and Kerek Cave, there are also several other caves in the area

 Cipicung Cave (± 3300 m long)
 Bibijilan Cave (± 717 m long)
 Adni Cave (± 635 m long)
 Nyangkut Cave (± 390 m long)
 Kubang Lanang Cave (± 302 m long)
 Goa Tanpa Nama (Unnamed Cave) (± 400 m long)
 Karsim Cave
 Bisoro Cave
 Idin Cave
 Gede Cave
 Kole Cave

References 

Sukabumi Regency
Caves of West Java
Tourist attractions in West Java